The 2012–13 season was FC Sheriff Tiraspol's 16th season, and their 14th in the Divizia Naţională, the top-flight of Moldovan football.

Squad

Out on loan

Transfers

In

Out

Loans in

Loans out

Released

Competitions

Moldovan Super Cup

Divizia Națională

Results summary

Results

League table

Moldovan Cup

UEFA Champions League

Qualifying rounds

UEFA Europa League

Qualifying rounds

Squad statistics

Appearances and goals

|-
|colspan="16"|Players away on loan :

|-
|colspan="16"|Players who left Sheriff Tiraspol during the season:

|}

Goal scorers

Disciplinary record

References

External links 
 

FC Sheriff Tiraspol seasons
Moldovan football clubs 2012–13 season